Champy can refer to:

Champ (folklore), reputed lake monster living in Lake Champlain.
Champagne (wine), a sparkling wine.
James A. Champy, one of the founders of the management theory behind Business process reengineering (BPR).